Ouissem Bousnina (born 20 January 1976) is a Tunisian handball player. He competed in the men's tournament at the 2000 Summer Olympics.

References

1976 births
Living people
Tunisian male handball players
Olympic handball players of Tunisia
Handball players at the 2000 Summer Olympics
Place of birth missing (living people)